Max Bork (1 January 1899 – 4 July 1973) was a German general during World War II who commanded the XIII Army Corps. He may have been a recipient of the Knight's Cross of the Iron Cross of Nazi Germany.

Bork was born in Lasdehnen, East Prussia, he joined the German Army in 1916 and remained in the Weimar German Reichswehr. In World War II  Bork commanded the 47th Infantry Division, the XIII Army Corps and the Korps "Bork". He received the German Cross in Gold on 16 August 1942 as Oberst im Generalstab of the LIII. Armeekorps

Towards the end of the war, Bork was nominated for Knight's Cross of the Iron Cross as commanding general of Korps "Bork". His nomination by the troop was received by the Heerespersonalamt (HPA—Army Staff Office) on 13 April 1945 via the Reichsführer-SS. Major Joachim Domaschk requested the explanatory statement from the Commander-in-Chief of AOK 1 via teleprinter message on 14 April 1945. He renewed his request on 5 May 1945. Domasck noted this in the book of "awarded Knight Crosses". In parallel the HPA received a second nomination by the troop, approved by all intermittent commanding officers, on 28 April 1945. This nomination apparently never made it to Major Domaschk. Both nominations by the troop fail to indicate further evidence that the nomination was processed or approved. The presentation date is an assumption of the Association of Knight's Cross Recipients (AKCR). Bork was a member of the AKCR.

He died in Hollern-Twielenfleth.

References

Bibliography

 
 
 

1899 births
1973 deaths
People from Krasnoznamensky District
People from East Prussia
Lieutenant generals of the German Army (Wehrmacht)
German Army personnel of World War I
Prussian Army personnel
Recipients of the clasp to the Iron Cross, 1st class
Recipients of the Gold German Cross
Recipients of the Knight's Cross of the Iron Cross
German prisoners of war in World War II
Reichswehr personnel